The Lewiston Historic District, is a historic district in Lewiston, California. The district is roughly bounded by Deadwood, Turnpike, and Schoolhouse Roads.

History 
The town of Lewiston was founded in 1853 as a mining and ranching town. It was is named after B. F. Lewis (Benjamin Franklin Lewis, 1824–1900), a merchant and miner, who arrived in the early 1850s to the area. The Lewiston post office was opened in 1854, followed by a general store, blacksmith, hotel, butcher shop, and some sort of river crossing (either a ferry or a toll bridge). By 1900, the town had a cemetery. The land was subject to periodic flooding, particularly in winter; until 1957, when they added the Trinity Dam.

The listing included 16 contributing buildings and a contributing structure. It includes Greek Revival architecture.

References

External links

Historic districts on the National Register of Historic Places in California
National Register of Historic Places in Trinity County, California
Greek Revival architecture in California